The Löbauer Berg is an extinct volcano and, with a height of , the Hausberg or local hill of the eponymous town of Löbau in the county of Görlitz in southeastern Saxony. It is covered in mixed mountain woodland consisting of common oak, hornbeam and small-leave lime.

References 

Mountains of Saxony
Lusatian Highlands
Löbau